Pentti Armas Uotinen (27 September 1931 – 3 November 2010) was a Finnish ski jumper who competed from 1951 to 1957.  He was born in Orimattila.

Uotinen finished tied for eighth in the individual normal hill event at the 1952 Winter Olympics in Oslo.  Uotinen's only career victory occurred in West Germany in 1956.

References

1931 births
2010 deaths
People from Orimattila
Olympic ski jumpers of Finland
Ski jumpers at the 1952 Winter Olympics
Finnish male ski jumpers
Sportspeople from Päijät-Häme
20th-century Finnish people